Hansruedi Engler (24 March 1928 – 23 December 2011) was a Swiss sprint canoeist who competed in the early 1950s. He competed in the K-1 1000 m event at the 1952 Summer Olympics in Helsinki, but was eliminated in the heats.

References
Hansruedi Engler's profile at Sports Reference.com

External links
 

1928 births
Canoeists at the 1952 Summer Olympics
Olympic canoeists of Switzerland
Swiss male canoeists
2011 deaths